During World War II, the United States Army Air Forces (USAAF) established numerous airfields in Ohio for training pilots and aircrews of USAAF fighters and bombers.

Most of these airfields were under the command of First Air Force or the Army Air Forces Training Command (AAFTC) (A predecessor of the current-day United States Air Force Air Education and Training Command).  However the other USAAF support commands (Air Technical Service Command (ATSC); Air Transport Command (ATC) or Troop Carrier Command) commanded a significant number of airfields in a support roles.

It is still possible to find remnants of these wartime airfields. Many were converted into municipal airports, some were returned to agriculture and several were retained as United States Air Force installations and were front-line bases during the Cold War. Hundreds of the temporary buildings that were used survive today, and are being used for other purposes.

Major airfields 

Army Air Force Training Command
 Bricker APT, Bowling Green
 Contract Primary Flying Instruction
 Now: Wood County Airport 
 Lockbourne AAB, Columbus
 374th Army Air Force Base Unit
 Was: Lockbourne Air Force Base (1948-1974)
 Was: Rickenbacker Air Force Base (1974-1980)
 Now:  Rickenbacker Air National Guard Base (1980-Present)
 Also: Rickenbacker International Airport  (1994-Pres) 
 Eastern Flight Training Center
 Kenton County Airport, Covington, Kentucky
 Sub-base of Lockbourne AAB
 Now: Cincinnati/Northern Kentucky International Airport

Air Transport Command
 Lunken APT, Cincinnati
 Joint use USAAF–Navy–Civil airfield
 Now: Cincinnati Municipal Lunken Airport

Air Technical Service Command
 Cleveland MAP, Cleveland
 Aircraft assembly and modification facilities
 Now: Cleveland Hopkins International Airport
 Patterson Field AAF, Fairborn
 478th Army Air Force Base Unit
 Merged 1948 with Wright Field AAF
 Wright Field, AAF, Dayton
 Merged 1948 with Patterson Field
 Now:  Wright-Patterson Air Force Base (1948-Pres)
 Dayton AAF, Dayton
 Sub-base of Wright Field AAF
 Joint use USAAF/Navy/Civil Airfield
 Now: Dayton International Airport
 Clinton County AAF, Wilmington, Ohio
 Sub-base of Wright Field AAF
 Glider Training
 Was: Clinton County Air Force Base (1947-1972)
 Now: Airborne Airpark

References
 Maurer, Maurer (1983). Air Force Combat Units Of World War II. Maxwell AFB, Alabama: Office of Air Force History. .
 Ravenstein, Charles A. (1984). Air Force Combat Wings Lineage and Honors Histories 1947-1977. Maxwell AFB, Alabama: Office of Air Force History. .
 Thole, Lou (1999), Forgotten Fields of America : World War II Bases and Training, Then and Now - Vol. 2.  Pictorial Histories Pub . 
 Military Airfields in World War II - Ohio

External links

 01
World War II
Airfields of the United States Army Air Forces in the United States by state
United States World War II army airfields